"Champagne Kisses" is a song by British singer Jessie Ware from her second studio album, Tough Love (2014). The song serves as the album's fourth official single, and a digital download containing two official remixes of the song was released in the United Kingdom on 20 April 2015. "Champagne Kisses" was written by Ware, Benny Blanco and Ben Ash, and was produced by BenZel.

Music video
On 17 January 2015, Ware confirmed on her Twitter account that the fourth single to be released from the album would be "Champagne Kisses". Chris Sweeney directed the video, which was published on Ware's YouTube account on 11 February 2015. The video shows surrealistic images that evoke the idea that Ware is patiently waiting for her turn in experiencing the supreme love she sings about in her song. The color palette is strongly composed by primary and secondary colours. There is no digital technology portrayed in the video but only objects from the analogue era. Most of the outfits worn by Ware are inspired by 1980s fashion apart from a black suit that could be from 1990s. Ariana Bacle from Entertainment Weekly wrote that watching the video "is like stepping into a modern art museum: Two-toned pills sit on silver chargers, clones of Ware are bound together by only hair, and bodies succumb to the fun mirror effect—but without any fun mirror in sight."

Track listings

Charts

Release history

References

2014 singles
2014 songs
2015 singles
Jessie Ware songs
Island Records singles
Songs written by Benny Blanco
Songs written by Jessie Ware
Songs written by Two Inch Punch